Khartsyzk or Khartsyzsk is a city of regional significance in Ukraine. The city has a population of Population:

History 
Starting Mid-April 2014 pro-Russian separatists took control of several towns in Donetsk Oblast. 

Unknown armed men took control of Khartsyzk city hall on 13 April 2014 and declared it part of the Donetsk People's Republic.

Demographics
Ethnicity as of the 2001 Ukrainian Census:

 Ukrainians: 52.4%
 Russians: 44.1%
 Belarusians: 0.9%
 Armenians: 0.3%
 Greeks: 0.3%
 Georgians: 0.2%

References

Cities in Donetsk Oblast
Cities of regional significance in Ukraine
Populated places established in the Russian Empire
Donetsk Raion